Ruby Rocker Stone (February 6, 1924 – May 1, 2013) was an American politician.

Born in Portal, Georgia, Stone went to Dickinson's Secretarial and Business School and was an office manager and in the real estate business. She also worked for the Idaho Legislature as an aide. Stone was appointed to the Idaho House of Representatives from Boise, Idaho succeeding her husband. She was later elected and served until her retirement in 2002.  She was a Republican although she often broke with her party on women's issues.

As a golfer and official, she was inducted into the Idaho Sports Hall of Fame. She died in Boise, Idaho.

References

External links
 

1924 births
2013 deaths
People from Portal, Georgia
People from Boise, Idaho
Businesspeople from Idaho
Women state legislators in Idaho
Members of the Idaho House of Representatives
20th-century American businesspeople
20th-century American women
21st-century American women